John Porter East (May 5, 1931 – June 29, 1986) was an American Republican politician who served as a U.S. senator from the state of North Carolina from 1981 until his suicide in 1986.

A paraplegic since 1955 because of polio, East was a professor of political science at East Carolina University in Greenville.

Early life and education 
John Porter East was born in Springfield, Illinois on May 5, 1931, the son of an employee of the State of Illinois. He received his Bachelor of Arts degree from Earlham College in Indiana where he was left tackle on the football team. After his graduation in 1953, he married Priscilla Sherk and was commissioned as an officer in the United States Marine Corps. In 1955, East contracted polio while serving at Camp Lejeune. He would never walk again. He received a LL.B. degree from the University of Illinois College of Law and practiced law in Naples, Florida for one year. He went on to receive his M.A. and Ph.D. in political science from the University of Florida.

Political career 

East was a protégé of conservative Senator Jesse Helms. In 1966, East ran unsuccessfully for a vacancy in the United States House of Representatives in a special election, a race won by Walter B. Jones, Sr.

In 1980, with the benefit of Ronald Reagan's North Carolina influence, East narrowly defeated incumbent Democratic Senator Robert Burren Morgan, largely on the strength of political advertising about Morgan's involvement with the turnover of the Panama Canal to the government of Panama.

In the Senate, he earned a reputation as a staunch social conservative, especially on the issue of abortion. Alongside Jesse Helms, East led opposition to the bill to create a federal holiday to honor Martin Luther King, Jr. in 1983.

East was also a national security hawk, and was a member of the Judiciary Subcommittee on Security and Terrorism along with Orrin Hatch and Jeremiah Denton. The committee is notable for its accusations of Soviet infiltration of left-wing think tanks, publications and activist groups such as the Institute for Policy Studies and the magazine Mother Jones. East's primary national security staffer on the committee, Samuel T. Francis, later a prominent columnist for The Washington Times, has been cited as an intellectual fore-bearer of the alt-right movement.

In 1986, East announced that he would not seek re-election, and would instead return to his teaching position. That summer, East, suffering from hypothyroidism, killed himself at his North Carolina home. He left a note that blamed his doctor for failing to diagnose a disease he believed had robbed him of his intellectual abilities.

Death 
On Friday, June 27, 1986, Senator East completed work on the book galleys of his collected essays. He met with Supreme Court nominee Antonin Scalia. Then, commitments met, the Senator drove to Greenville with his aide, John Petree, and arrived home about noon on Saturday. Petree stayed with him until daughter Kathryn arrived for a visit. Kathryn left her father "in good spirits" about midnight. Petree returned to East's house on Sunday morning, June 29. He found the front door ajar. The senator was dead in his garage, a victim of suicide by carbon monoxide poisoning.
North Carolina Governor James G. Martin appointed U.S. Representative Jim Broyhill to serve out the rest of East's term. Broyhill was later defeated in his election bid in November 1986 by former Democratic Governor Terry Sanford.

East is buried in Arlington National Cemetery.

See also 
 List of United States Congress members who died in office (1950–99)

References

Further reading

 John Porter East Memorial Service transcript (U.S. Senate)

External links 
ANC Explorer

1931 births
1986 suicides
1986 deaths
American political scientists
American politicians with disabilities
American politicians who committed suicide
Burials at Arlington National Cemetery
Earlham College alumni
East Carolina University faculty
Jesse Helms
New Right (United States)
North Carolina Republicans
People from Greenville, North Carolina
People with polio
Politicians from Springfield, Illinois
Politicians with paraplegia
Republican Party United States senators from North Carolina
Suicides by carbon monoxide poisoning
Suicides in North Carolina
United States Marines
University of Florida alumni
University of Illinois College of Law alumni
Wheelchair users
20th-century political scientists